Strašice is a municipality and village in Rokycany District in the Plzeň Region of the Czech Republic. It has about 2,500 inhabitants.

History
The first written mention of Strašice is from 1349.

Notable people
Jiří Feureisl (1931–2021), footballer

References

Villages in Rokycany District